Kur Gai Kur (born 20 February 2000) is a South Sudanese professional footballer who plays as a midfielder for the North Macedonian club Rabotnički and the South Sudan national team.

Club career
Kur was born a South Sudanese refugee in Kenya, and moved to Australia at the age of 2. He began playing football with Modbury Vista from the age of 8 to 9, before joining the Skillaroos program until he was 16. He then signed to Modbury before joining the Croydon Kings in 2020. He transferred to Adelaide City in 2021, where he began his senior career.

International career
Kur made his debut with the South Sudan national team in a friendly 2–1 friendly loss to Jordan on 31 January 2022.

References

External links
 
 
 MyGameDay profile

2000 births
Living people
Sportspeople from Mombasa
People with acquired South Sudanese citizenship
South Sudanese footballers
Association football midfielders
FK Novi Pazar players
South Sudan international footballers
South Sudanese expatriate footballers
Expatriate footballers in Serbia
South Sudanese emigrants to Australia
Naturalised citizens of Australia
Australian soccer players
Modbury Jets SC players
Croydon Kings players
Adelaide City FC players
National Premier Leagues players
Australian expatriate soccer players
Australian expatriate sportspeople in Serbia
Australian people of South Sudanese descent
Sportspeople of South Sudanese descent